Vladimir Androić (born 30 July 1957) is a Serbian professional basketball coach and former professional player who is currently an assistant coach for Partizan Belgrade of the Serbian KLS, the Adriatic League and the EuroLeague.

Playing career 
A point guard, Androić played in Yugoslavia from 1975 to 1990 for Železničar Čačak, Borac Čačak, Šibenka, and Partizan. He retired as a player with Partizan in 1990.

Coaching career 
After retirement in 1990, Androić joined a coaching staff of Borac Čačak under Ratko Joksić as an assistant coach. After two years as the assistant coach, Androić got promoted as the new head coach of Borac. Later, he coached Mašinac and Mladost Čačak. Also, he coached teams in Cyprus and Russia (Lokomotiv Rostov).

On 14 October 2011, Zagreb hired Androić as their new head coach. On 29 March 2012, Zagreb parted ways with him.

In August 2013, head coach Željko Obradović added Androić to the Fenerbahçe coaching staff as an assistant. Androić left Fenerbahçe following the departure of coach Obradović after the end of the 2019–20 season.

In August 2021, Androić was named an assistant coach for Partizan under Željko Obradović.

Career achievements  
As assistant coach
 EuroLeague champion: 1 (with Fenerbahçe: 2016–17) 
 Turkish League champion: 4 (with Fenerbahçe: 2013–14, 2015–16, 2016–17, 2017–18)
 Turkish Cup winner: 3 (with Fenerbahçe: 2016, 2019, 2020)
 Turkish Super Cup winner: 3 (with Fenerbahçe: 2013, 2016, 2017)

Personal life 
His father Borislav Androić was born in Petrova Gora, a village near Lobor, in present-day Croatia. As a military analyst of the Yugoslav National Army, Borislav moved to Čačak prior Vladimir was born and there he met Vladimir's mother.

Androić is a best man of basketball coach Željko Obradović.

References

External links
 Profile at eurobasket.com

1957 births
Living people
Basketball players from Čačak
KK Borac Čačak coaches
KK Borac Čačak players
KK Mašinac coaches
KK Napredak Kruševac coaches
KK Partizan players
KK Šibenik players
KK Železničar Čačak players
Point guards
Serbian expatriate basketball people in Croatia
Serbian expatriate basketball people in Cyprus
Serbian expatriate basketball people in Russia
Serbian expatriate basketball people in Turkey
Serbian men's basketball coaches
Serbian men's basketball players
Serbian people of Croatian descent
Yugoslav basketball coaches
Yugoslav men's basketball players